Houzhu may refer to:

Emperor Houzhu of Han (207–271), Liu Shan, last emperor of the Chinese state of Shu Han
Emperor Houzhu of Northern Qi (557–577), Gao Wei, emperor of the Chinese dynasty Northern Qi
Emperor Houzhu of Western Liang, Xiao Cong, emperor of the Chinese Liang Dynasty from 585 to 587
Houzhu of Later Shu (919–965), Meng Chang, Emperor of Chinese state Later Shu
Li Houzhu (937–978), Li Yu, last ruler of the Chinese state Southern Tang
Emperor Houzhu of Southern Han (942–980), Liu Chang, last King of the Chinese kingdom Southern Han